In mathematics, in the field of potential theory, the fine topology is a natural topology for setting the study of subharmonic functions. In the earliest studies of subharmonic functions, namely those for which  where  is the Laplacian, only smooth functions were considered. In that case it was natural to consider only the Euclidean topology, but with the advent of upper semi-continuous subharmonic functions introduced by F. Riesz, the fine topology became the more natural tool in many situations.

Definition 

The fine topology on the Euclidean space  is defined to be the coarsest topology making all subharmonic functions (equivalently all superharmonic functions) continuous. Concepts in the fine topology are normally prefixed with the word 'fine' to distinguish them from the corresponding concepts in the usual topology, as for example 'fine neighbourhood' or 'fine continuous'.

Observations 

The fine topology was introduced in 1940 by Henri Cartan to aid in the study of thin sets and was initially considered to be somewhat pathological due to the absence of a number of properties such as local compactness which are so frequently useful in analysis. Subsequent work has shown that the lack of such properties is to a certain extent compensated for by the presence of other slightly less strong properties such as the quasi-Lindelöf property.

In one dimension, that is, on the real line, the fine topology coincides with the usual topology since in that case the  subharmonic functions are precisely the convex functions which are already continuous in  the usual (Euclidean) topology. Thus, the fine topology is of most interest in  where . The fine topology in this case is strictly finer than the usual topology, since there are discontinuous subharmonic functions. 

Cartan observed in correspondence with Marcel Brelot that it is equally possible to develop the theory of the fine topology by using the concept of 'thinness'. In this development, a set  is thin at a point  if there exists a subharmonic function  defined on a neighbourhood of  such  that 

Properties of the fine topology 

The fine topology is in some ways much less tractable than the usual topology in euclidean space, as is evidenced by the following (taking ):

The fine topology does at least have a few 'nicer' properties:

The fine topology has the Baire property.

The fine topology does not possess the Lindelöf property but it does have the slightly weaker quasi-Lindelöf property:

An arbitrary union of fine open subsets of  differs by a polar set from some countable subunion.

References 

 

Subharmonic functions